Vitória de Santo Antão is a city in Pernambuco State, Brazil, 46 kilometers west of Recife. Its territorial area is 335,942 km², 5,717 km² of which lies within the urban perimeter. In 2021, the Brazilian Institute of Geography and Statistics (IBGE) estimated its population at approximately  140 389 inhabitants, being the tenth most populous city in Pernambuco, the fourth most populous in the interior of the state and the most populous in Zona da Mata. According to the Firjan Municipal Development Index (IFDM), Vitória de Santo Antão was elected the 8th best city of Pernambuco to live in.

Synopsis 

    Its predominant native vegetation is Atlantic forest, although much of its green landscape has been replaced by sugarcane monoculture. With approximately 87.2% of the population living in the urban area of the municipality, the city had 57 health facilities in 2009. Its Human Development Index is 0.640 and is considered medium.().

It was founded by a Portuguese man from Cape Verde named António Diogo de Braga in 1626. In 1774 it became a village with 4,000 inhabitants. In 1811 it was promoted into a city by royal decree of Dom João IV.

Geography
 State - Pernambuco
 Region - Zona da mata Pernambucana(-2018) 
Intermediate Geographic Region of Recife.(2018–Present)

 Boundaries - Glória do Goitá and Chã de Alegria  (N); Primavera and Escada (S); Pombos   (W); Moreno, Cabo de Santo Agostinho and São Lourenço da Mata  (E)
 Area - 371.8 km2
 Elevation - 156 m
 Hydrography - Capibaribe, Ipojuca and Tapacurá
 Vegetation - Subperenifólia forest
 Climate - Hot tropical and humid
 Annual average temperature - 23.4 c
 Distance to Recife - 45 km

Climate

With a hot and humid climate, the city is concentrated on the Borborema plateau, in the mountainous region of Pernambuco. 

The average temperature is 23.8 °C. It has rainy and mild winters with temperatures between 13 °C and 18 °C.
In summer the highs are up to 32° in regions west of the city.

Economy

The main economic activities in Vitoria de Santo Antão are based in commerce, food and beverage industry (including the traditional Pitú cachaça),  and primary sector especially sugarcane, lemons and cattle.

It has the 8th largest economy in Pernambuco, has an industrial pole with some of the largest companies in the world. There is also Victory Park Shopping, the shopping mall in the region.

The city also has a tradition in agriculture.

Economic Indicators

Economy by Sector
2006

Health Indicators

References

Municipalities in Pernambuco